Diamantino Iuna Fafé (born 10 June 2001) is a Bissau-Guinean freestyle wrestler. He is a two-time medalist at the African Wrestling Championships. He competed in the men's 57 kg event at the 2020 Summer Olympics held in Tokyo, Japan.

Career 

In 2018, he won the gold medal in the 55 kg event at the African Youth Games. In 2019, he competed in the 57 kg event at the World Wrestling Championships held in Nur-Sultan, Kazakhstan where he was eliminated in his first match by Yuki Takahashi of Japan.

He qualified at the 2021 African & Oceania Wrestling Olympic Qualification Tournament to represent Guinea-Bissau at the 2020 Summer Olympics in Tokyo, Japan.

He won one of the bronze medals in his event at the 2022 African Wrestling Championships held in El Jadida, Morocco.

Achievements

References

External links 
 
 
 

2001 births
Living people
Bissau-Guinean male sport wrestlers
African Wrestling Championships medalists
Olympic wrestlers of Guinea-Bissau
Wrestlers at the 2020 Summer Olympics
Place of birth missing (living people)